William Wriothesley or Wrythe (pronunciation uncertain:  RYE-zlee (archaic),  ROTT-slee (present-day) and   RYE-əths-lee have been suggested) (died 1513) was an officer of arms at the College of Arms in London. He was the second son of Garter King of Arms, John Writhe; the younger brother of Thomas Wriothesley; and the father of Thomas Wriothesley, 1st Earl of Southampton.

Personal life
Wriothesley was probably born in London, Middlesex, or at Colatford, Wiltshire. His name at birth was William Writhe, and he was the second son of John Writhe and his first wife, Barbara, daughter of John Castlecombe.

Wriothesley lived in the Barbican in London, and was a citizen and draper. 

He married Agnes Drayton of London, and they had one son, Thomas, who was born in 1505, and later became earl of Southampton. Wriothesley died young, some time before 26 April 1513 when Thomas Yonge became York Herald.

Heraldic career
Wriothesley was appointed Rouge Croix in circa 1505, and York Herald in 1509.

Footnotes

See also
Herald

References

External links
The College of Arms

People from Wiltshire
English officers of arms
Merchants from London
Year of birth missing
15th-century births
1513 deaths
15th-century English people
16th-century English people
William